Chiliodendro (before 1927: Ζελήνη - Zelini) is a village in Kastoria Regional Unit, Macedonia, Greece.

The Greek census (1920) recorded 457 people in the village and in 1923 there were 150 inhabitants (or 70 families) who were Muslim. Following the Greek-Turkish population exchange, in 1926 within Zelini there were 23 refugee families from Asia Minor and 12 refugee families from Pontus. The Greek census (1928) recorded 440 village inhabitants. There were 35 refugee families (140 people) in 1928.

References

Populated places in Kastoria (regional unit)